Noreen is an Irish given name, anglicised from Nóirín. Notable people with the given name include:

Noreen Branson (1910–2003), British communist historian and activist
Noreen Coen (born 1993), Irish camogie player
Noreen Connell (born 1947), American feminist organizer, writer and editor
Noreen Corcoran (1943-2016), American actress, dancer and singer
Noreen Culhane (born 1950), American businesswoman
Noreen Evans (born 1955), American lawyer and politician 
Noreen Kershaw (born 1950), British actress and director
Noreen Motamed (born 1967), Iranian-American artist and painter
Noreen Oliver (born 1960), British businesswoman
Noreen Nash (born 1924), American actress
Noreen Stevens (born 1962), Canadian cartoonist
Noreen Young (born 1952), Canadian producer and puppeteer

Irish feminine given names